Surrey County Cricket Club is one of eighteen county teams in England that play first-class cricket. The club is based in Kennington (formerly part of the county of Surrey). It was founded in 1845 after securing a lease on The Oval for its use as a cricket field. Surrey played their first first-class cricket match in 1846 against Marylebone Cricket Club and have gone on to win the County Championship on nineteen occasions, a figure bettered only by Yorkshire. The club have played both List A cricket and Twenty20 cricket since their introductions into the English game in 1963 and 2003 respectively. The player appointed club captain leads the side in all their fixtures, except when unavailable through injury or some other reason. Players who captained the side as substitute for the official club captain are not included in the list below.

History
Since attaining first-class status, Surrey have named 41 official captains, including two who have been appointed twice: George Strachan in the late nineteenth century and Errol Holmes, who had spells either side of the Second World War.

List of club captains
 Years denotes the years for which the player was named as official club captain for Surrey.
 First denotes the date of the first match in which the player is recorded as captaining Surrey.
 Last denotes the date of the last match in which the player is recorded as captaining Surrey.
 FC denotes the number of first-class matches in which the player is recorded as captaining Surrey.
 LA denotes the number of List A matches in which the player captained Surrey.
 T20 denotes the number of Twenty20 matches in which the player captained Surrey.
 Total denotes the total number of first-class, List A and Twenty20 matches in which the player is recorded as captaining Surrey.

Note: In the club's earliest years, match scorecards do not always identify which player captained the side.

References

Bibliography
Surrey County Cricket Club Yearbook, 2005. (No ISBN given.)

Notes

 
London sport-related lists
Lists of cricket captains
Captains
Lists of English cricketers
Cricket captains